Murr Television, marketed and known as MTV Lebanon, is a Lebanese television station based in Naccache, Metn District.

History
Founded in 1991 by Gabriel Murr, a Lebanese businessman and politician.

MTV was shut down in 2002 as it was found guilty of violating article 68 of the electoral law of 1999 which bans propaganda during the election process but, since other Lebanese channels did not comply with the law either, some observers suspect that the closure was due to MTV’s criticism of the Lebanese government and of Syria. As well as lawsuit against MTV

In 2005, the Lebanese parliament decided to amend article 68 and reopen the station after the Syrian troops withdrew from Lebanon and the anti-Syrian opposition coalition won a majority in Lebanon’s parliament, but the station remained closed.

The station reopened its doors seven years later, on April 7, 2009, two months before the 2009 parliamentary elections.

TV program

 Dancing with the Stars (Middle East & North Africa) (Celebrity Dance Show)
 The Voice Kids (Middle East & North Africa)
 Celebrity Duets (Middle East & North Africa; Season 4) (Celebrity Singing Show)
 So You Think You Can Dance – Yalla Nerkos! (Talent show)
 Hayda Haki (Comedy-oriented talk and variety show)
 Mafi Metlo
 Touche pas à mon poste !/Menna w Jerr
 Talk of the Town
 Deal or No Deal (Game show)
 The Lyrics Board/Heik Min Ghanni
 The Doctors
 Vendredi tout est permis/Layle Jnoun (الليلة جنون)
 Family Feud/Kel Mayle 3ayle
 Chance of a Lifetime/Lamin el Malayin
 Everybody's Equal/Khallik Maana
 Dr. Hala
 Tahkik
 Al Hal Enna
 Who Knows/Meen Byaaref (Celebrity quiz show)
 Ktir Salbeh (2010–2012)

Production
MTV produces all their productions at 'Studiovision' studios .

Website and mobile application
MTV requires a subscription for “premium” content, but they offer some content for free.

References

External links
  
  

1991 establishments in Lebanon
2002 disestablishments in Lebanon
Television channels and stations established in 1991
Television channels and stations disestablished in 2002
Television channels and stations established in 2009
2009 establishments in Lebanon
Mass media in Beirut
Television stations in Lebanon
Arabic-language television stations